Carew Harbour (former name Barnards Harbour) is a  wide bay indenting for  the southwest coast of West Falkland in the Falkland Islands, South Atlantic.  It is part of Queen Charlotte Bay, centered at

References

Bays of West Falkland